Lowell is an unincorporated community in Columbus Township, Bartholomew County, in the U.S. state of Indiana.

History
Lowell was founded in 1853.

Geography

References

Unincorporated communities in Bartholomew County, Indiana
Unincorporated communities in Indiana